In the counting system used  in the Cornish language, the numerals (number words) below 100 are based on twenties: so numbers from 21–39 are "x on twenty", 41–59 are "x on two twenty", numbers from 61–79 are "x on three twenty", and numbers from 81–99 are "x on four twenty". 40 is "two twenty", 60 is "three twenty", and 80 is "four twenty". This is very similar to counting in the Welsh language. It is also similar to the French numerals for 60–99.

Numerals

Variation in form
There is some syntactically and phonologically triggered variation in the form of numerals. There are, for example, masculine and feminine forms of the numbers "two" ( and ), "three" ( and ) and "four" ( and ), which must agree with the grammatical gender of the objects being counted. Numerals change as expected according to normal rules of consonant mutation; some also trigger mutation in some following words.

Use with nouns
The singular form of the noun is used with numbers, but for larger numbers an alternative form is permitted, where  (partitive, "of") with the plural noun follows the number.

Nouns are also mutated following many numbers.  triggers the soft mutation of feminine nouns, but not masculine nouns. It also causes the word dydh "day" to become unn jydh "one day".  and  both trigger the soft mutation.  and  trigger the aspirate mutation. The part of the number immediately preceding the noun will determine any mutation of the noun.

The following example with kath "cat" illustrates several of these points:

Diw gath
Two cats

 
Twenty-three cats (literally "Three cat on twenty")

 
Seventy-eight cats (literally "Eighteen cat and three-twenty")

  or
 
Three hundred and forty eight thousand, six hundred and sixty nine cats (348,669)

Milvil gath or
Milvil a gathes
A million cats

References

Williams, N. Desky Kernowek (Evertype, 2012)
Brown, W. A Grammar of Modern Cornish (Kesva an Taves Kernewek, 2001)

Cornish language
Numerals